Loman is an unincorporated community in Koochiching County, Minnesota, United States.

The community is located between International Falls and Baudette at the intersection of State Highway 11 (MN 11) and County Road 32 (Black River Road).  Loman is located within Northwest Koochiching Unorganized Territory.

The Rainy River and the Black River meet at Loman.  Nearby places include Indus, Pelland, and Littlefork.

Loman is located 21 miles west-southwest of International Falls; and 47 miles east-southeast of Baudette.

A US Post Office has been in operation since 1901. A Miss Jennie Mourhess was the first postmaster.

History
Loman was founded by and named after the pioneer homesteaders George W. Loman and his wife Mary M. McFarland.

References

 Rand McNally Road Atlas – 2007 edition – Minnesota entry
 Official State of Minnesota Highway Map – 2011/2012 edition
 Mn/DOT map of Koochiching County – Sheet 3 – 2011 edition

Unincorporated communities in Minnesota
Unincorporated communities in Koochiching County, Minnesota